A rookie is a person new to a profession or an athlete in their first season.

Rookie, Rookies or The Rookie may also refer to:

Art
 The Rookie (painting), a 1957 painting by Norman Rockwell

Film and television

Film
 Rookies (1927 film), an American silent comedy film directed by Sam Wood
 The Rookie (1959 film), an American comedy film directed by George O'Hanlon
 The Rookie (1990 film), an American buddy cop film directed by and starring Clint Eastwood
 The Rookie (2002 film), an American baseball film directed by John Lee Hancock
 The Rookies (2019 film), a Chinese action film directed by Alan Yuen

Television
 Rookies (American TV series), a 2008–2009 American reality series
 The Rookie (TV series), an American comedy-drama crime series that debuted in 2018
 The Rookie (web series), a 2007–2008 spinoff of the television series 24
 The Rookies, a 1972–1976 American crime drama series
 "Rookies" (Star Wars: The Clone Wars), an episode

Music
 Rookie (EP), by Red Velvet, 2017
 "Rookie" (Red Velvet song), the title song
 "Rookie" (Sakanaction song), 2011
 "Rookie" / "Stay Gold", a single by Flow, 2005
 Rookie, an album by Black Kids, 2017

Publications
 Rookie (magazine), a defunct American online magazine for teenagers created by Tavi Gevinson
 Rookies (manga), a Japanese manga and television drama
 The Rookie (novel), by Scott Sigler

People
 Rookie Brown (1925–1971), American professional basketball player
 Rookie Davis (born 1993), American professional baseball pitcher 
 Brian Wilson (poker player) (born 1967), nicknamed "Rookie", American real estate developer and poker player

See also

 
 
 Rookie League
 Ruki (disambiguation)
 Rook (disambiguation)
 Rookery (disambiguation)